Novozhilovo is a rural locality (a village) in Sosnovskoye Rural Settlement of Priozersky District, Leningrad Oblast, of northwest Russia. Population: 

It is the location of the motorsport complex Igora Drive, designed by Hermann Tilke.

References 

Rural localities in Leningrad Oblast